Hanuman Nagar may refer to:

Hanuman Nagar, Saptari, Nepal
Hanuman Nagar, Siraha, Nepal